Aleksandar Živanović may refer to:

Aleksandar Živanović (futsal player)
Aleksandar Živanović (footballer, born 1987)